Anna-Lena Friedsam was the defending champion but chose to participate in Mallorca instead.

Evgeniya Rodina won the title, defeating Rebecca Šramková in the final, 6–4, 6–4.

Seeds

Main draw

Finals

Top half

Bottom half

References 
 Main draw

Aegon Ilkley Trophy - Singles
2016 Women's Singles